The  is a Shinto shrine located in the city of Mishima in Shizuoka Prefecture, Japan. It is the ichinomiya of former Izu Province.  The main festival of the shrine is held annually on August 16, and features yabusame performances.

Enshrined kami
Kanpei-taisha

History
The date of Mishima Taisha's foundation is unknown. Per shrine tradition and Nara period records, the predecessor of the shrine may have originally located on Miyakejima but was transferred later from place to place. It first appears in national chronicles in the Nihon Kōki in an entry date 832, with the location given as being in  Kamo county, which is in the southern part of Izu Peninsula, near modern Shimoda. Subsequent mentions in the Nihon Montoku Tennō Jitsuroku (850, 852, 854), the Nihon Sandai Jitsuroku (859, 864) and the Ruijū Kokushi (868) mention the shrine, but not its location. By the time of the Engishiki in 927 AD, the shrine's location is listed as being in Tagata county, or its present location.

Mishima Taisha was greatly revered by  Minamoto no Yoritomo after he was exiled to Izu, and he made prayers at the shrine at the start of his  struggle to overthrow the Heike clan in the Genpei War. After the successful establishment of the Kamakura shogunate, he rebuilt the shrine on a large scale, and worship of the Mishima Daimyōjin became popular with the samurai class. The shrine continued to be supported by Yoritomo's successors, especially the fourth Shogun Kujō Yoritsune.   During the Sengoku period the kami of Mishima Taisha came to be associated with victory in battle, and the shrine was patronized by the Odawara Hōjō, the Imagawa clan and the Tokugawa clan.

During the Edo period, Mishima Taisha and its associated post town of Mishima-shuku prospered as a popular pilgrimage stop on the Tōkaidō highway between Edo and Kyoto. Its torii gate was depicted in an ukiyo-e print by Hiroshige. A calendar issued by the shrine was carried home by pilgrims from all over Japan, and was known as the "Mishima Calendar".

During the Meiji period era of State Shinto, the shrine was designated as an  under the Modern system of ranked Shinto Shrines  in 1871,  meaning that it stood in the first rank of government supported shrines. However, its name was not changed from "Mishima Jinja" to "Mishima Taisha" until after World War II.

Cultural properties

National Treasures
 , Heian period. The most important object in the Mishima Shrine collection is a Japanese lacquerware wooden box with maki-e decoration. The box measures 25.8 x 34.5 x 19.7 cm, and contains numerous utensils and articles used for women's cosmetics in the late Heian period. It is the oldest existing hand box that has its original contents. It was donated to the shrine by Hōjō Masako. It is listed as one of the National Treasures of Japan from 1900.

Important Cultural Properties
 Honden, a three-bay nagare-zukuri style building, has been reconstructed numerous times over the history of the shrine. The current building dates from 1867, having been rebuilt after the shrine was flattened in the Ansei Tōkai earthquake of 1854. It is registered as a National Important Cultural Property.

 Tachi (Japanese sword), Kamakura period, donated to the shrine by Emperor Meiji.
 Wakizashi short sword, Nanboku-cho period, dated 1364, from a forge in Sagami
 , dated 1203, written by Minamoto no Yoriie
 , a collection of 592 documents of shrine records from the Kamakura through Edo periods.

Natural Monuments
Osmanthus fragrans tree, estimated to be 1200-years-old  in the shrine precincts is protected by the national government as a Natural Monument..

Gallery

See also

 List of National Treasures of Japan (crafts-others)
 List of Shinto shrines
 Ichinomiya

Notes

External links

References
 Earle, Joe. (2005). Splendors of Imperial Japan. The Khalili Collections. 
 Maas, Jeffrey P. (1999). Yoritomo and the Founding of the First Bakufu: The Origins of Dual Government in Japan. Stanford: Stanford University Press. 
 Plutschow, Herbe. (1996). Matsuri: The Festivals of Japan. London: RoutledgeCurzon. 
 Ponsonby-Fane, Richard Arthur Brabazon. (1959).  The Imperial House of Japan. Kyoto: Ponsonby Memorial Society. OCLC 194887

Shinto shrines in Shizuoka Prefecture
Ichinomiya
Izu Province
Natural monuments of Japan
Mishima, Shizuoka
Beppyo shrines